The Defence of Festubert was an engagement early in the First World War when Indian and British battalions of the 7th (Meerut) Division, Indian Army defended the village of Festubert against a German attack from 23–24 November 1914. It is notable for being one of the first actions in the war in which an attack was made against a prepared defensive position, thus foreshadowing the years of trench warfare which were to come.

The British and Indian regiments that took part were awarded the battle honour Festubert 1914.

Battle

23–24 November

The fighting around Ypres subsided in mutual exhaustion by 22 November and for about three weeks bad weather also inhibited operations apart from artillery-fire, bombing and sniping. At the end of the month the British made several night raids and on 23 November, the German Infantry Regiment 112 captured  of trench east of Festubert in the Indian Corps area. The Indians counter-attacked through the night and recovered the trenches. The Defence of Festubert was one of the first attacks on an organised trench system. Most notably a night attack also occurred, involving mainly Mazhabi Sikhs of the 34th Royal Sikh Pioneers Regiment and the 1st Battalion Manchester Regiment. The battle was a costly British victory, the lost trench was recaptured but there were many casualties in the Mazhabi Sikhs and the 1st Manchesters.

Order of battle

Notes

Footnotes

References

Further reading

External links

 The Long, Long Trail, The Winter Operations 1914–15
 Defrance, C. Indians, unheralded heroes

Battle honours of the British Army